Blood of My Blood can refer to:

 Blood of My Blood, Game of Thrones episode
 Blood of My Blood (2011 film), a Portuguese film
 Blood of My Blood (2015 film), an Italian film